is an interchange railway station on the Ōu Main Line in the city of Yokote, Akita Prefecture,  Japan, operated by JR East.

Lines
Yokote Station is served by the Ōu Main Line, and is located 228.3 km from the terminus of the line at Fukushima Station. It is also the terminal station of the Kitakami Line and is located 61.1 km from the opposing terminus of the line at Kitakami Station.

Station layout
The station consists of a one island platform and two opposed side platforms serving four tracks, although Platform 4 is not normally in use. The platforms are connected by a footbridge. The station has two station buildings on the west and east sides. There is a Midori no Madoguchi staffed ticket office.

Platforms

History
Yokote Station opened on June 15, 1905 as a station on the Japanese Government Railways (JGR), serving the town of Yokote, Akita. The Yokosho Railway began operations to the station on August 18, 1918 and the predecessor to the Kitakami line began operations from October 10, 1920. A new station building was completed in November 1924, but was destroyed in American air raids on July 15 and August 5, 1945. The JGR became the Japanese National Railways (JNR) after World War II. The Yokosho Line ceased operations on April 20, 1971. A new station building was completed in April 1978. All freight operations were discontinued from November 1986. The station was absorbed into the JR East network upon the privatization of the JNR on April 1, 1987. A new station building was opened in October 2011.

Passenger statistics
In fiscal 2018, the station was used by an average of 1247 passengers daily (boarding passengers only).

Surrounding area

East side
 Yokote City Office

West side
  (Yokote Bypass)
 Hiraka General Hospital

See also
List of railway stations in Japan

References

External links

 JR East Station information 

Railway stations in Japan opened in 1905
Railway stations in Akita Prefecture
Ōu Main Line
Kitakami Line
Yokote, Akita